Raja Lakhamgouda Law College is an institution for legal education situated in Belgaum, Karnataka, India. It was established in 1939 by the Karnataka Law Society, and is one of the oldest Indian Law Colleges.   The college is named after Raja Lakhamgouda Sirdesai, the head of the former princely state of Vantamuri who has served as a mentor and donor to the school.

About Institute
The college has a classrooms, computer labs, playground, gymnasium, library building,  canteen, and boys and girls hostels with medical facilities.

The college library has a collection of books and journals for learning and research. The college subscribes to several journals, newspapers and periodicals relating to the profession of law, general knowledge and general reading.  A large part of library work has been computerized.  There is a digital library available where students have access to all books, reports of Law Commissions and Bare Acts. It has services of the internet, Wi-Fi and CCTV. The college has started the 5 year law courses (B. A., LL. B. and B. B. A., LL. B.), incorporating the recent socio-legal aspects in the curriculum. The students have won several championships in sports, debate, and elocution.  They participate in several national and international level Moot Court competitions.

It has conducted seminars on Right to Information, Judicial activism, Gender Justice, Protection of Women against Domestic Violence.

Location
The college is situated on a large campus, in Tilakwadi, a suburb of Belgaum.

Affiliation and recognition

R. L. Law College was initially affiliated to Bombay University, and after the establishment of Karnataka University it is now affiliated to the Karnataka State Law University, Hubli. The college is recognised by the Bar Council of India as well as by the Government of Karnataka.

Notable alumni

In the Judiciary
 Late Shri E. S. Venkataramiah 	- Former Chief Justice of India.
 Shri S. Rajendra Babu 	- Former Chief Justice of Supreme Court & Chairman, National Human Rights Commission
 Shri S.R. Bannurmath 	        - Former Chief Justice of Kerala High Court
 Shri V.S. Malimath 	        - Former Chief Justice of Kerala High Court, and Former Vice Chairman, National Human Rights Commission.
 Shri A.S. Pachhapure 	        - Judge, Karnataka High Court
 Shri A.P.Lavande 	        - Judge, Bombay High Court
 Shri R.M.S. Khandeparker 	- Judge, Mumbai High Court (Goa Bench)
 Shri A.K. Lakshmeshwar 	- Former Judge, Karnataka High Court
 Late Shri K.B. Navadagi 	- Former Judge, Karnataka High Court
 Shri D.P. Hiremath 	        - Former Judge, Karnataka High Court
 Shri M.M. Mirdhe 	        - Former Judge, Karnataka High Court
 Shri A.R. Muragod 	        - Former Judge, Karnataka High Court
 Shri Mohammad Anwar 	        - Former Judge, Karnataka High Court
 Shri N.D.V. Bhat 	        - Former Judge, Karnataka High Court
 Shri P.A. Kulkarni 	        - Former Judge, Karnataka High Court
 Shri M.S. Nesaragi 	        - Former Judge, Karnataka High Court
 Late Shri G.N. Sabhahit       - Former Judge, Karnataka High Court
 Shri H. Suresh 	        - Former Judge, Bombay High Court
 Shri S.B. Bhasme 	        - Former Judge, Bombay High Court
 Shri N.B. Naik                - Former Judge, Bombay High Court
 shri. Sachin S Magadum
Judge Highcourt of Karnataka 
Shri. Ravi Hosamani 
Judge High court of Karnataka 
 Shri K.K. Venugopal           - Attorney General of India

Former students of R. L. Law College include Chief Justices of the Supreme Court of India E. S. Venkataramiah (19th), and S. Rajendra Babu (34th);
former Chief Justices of Kerala High Court, V. S. Malimath and S. R. Bannurmath;  justices of Karnataka High Court A. K. Lakshmeshwar, K.B. Navadagi, D. P. Hiremath, M. M. Mirdhe, A. R. Murgod, Mohammed Anwar, N. D. V. Bhat,  P. A. Kulkarni, M. S. Nesaragi, G. N. Sabhahit and A. S. Paschapure; former Justices of Bombay High Court S. B. Bhasme, N. B. Naik, H. Suresh, R. M. S. Khandeparkar and A. P. Lavande; and in Constitutional Law, Shri K.K. Venugopal, designated Senior Advocate of Supreme Court of India.

In Politics
 Shri S.R. Bommai- Former Chief Minister of Karnataka
 Shri J.H.Patel- Former Chief Minister of Karnataka state.
 Shri B. Shankaranand- Former Union Minister of Health.
 Smt. Sarojini Mahishi- Former Union Minister of Company Affairs.
 Shri D.B. Chandregouda- Former Law Minister, Govt. of Karnataka.
 Late Shri Suresh.Angadi- MoS, Railway Ministry, Govt. of India
 Shri A.K. Kotrashetty- Ex. M.P.
 Shri Patil Puttappa- Journalist, Freedom Fighter, Former M.P.
 Late Shri Haranahalli Ramaswamy- Former Minister of Law & Parliamentary Affairs, Govt. of Karnataka.
 Late Shri B.G. Banakar- Former Speaker, Karnataka State Legislative Assembly.
 Shri S.B. Sidnal - Former M.P.
 Shri D.K. Naikar - Former Minister for Law, Minister for Municipal Administration & 3 time M.P. (1980,85 & 90)
 Shri. K. Ramachandra Reddy- Former M.P.
 Late Shri G.B. Shankar Rao- Former Minister, Govt. of Karnataka.
 Late Shri B. Basavalingappa- Former Minister for Revenue – 1977
 Shri L.G. Havanur- Former Minister for Law
 Shri N.M.K. Sogi- Former Deputy Minister of Education
 Shri A.B. Jakanur- Former M.L.A. & Minister, government of Karnataka
 Shri Omprakash Kanagali- Former Minister Karnataka Govt.
 Shri R.D. Khalap - Former Deputy Chief Minister, Govt. of Goa & Former Minister for Law, Govt. of India
 Shri Luizinho Faleiro - Hon’ble Education Minister, Govt. of Goa

Former students of the college have achieved high positions within parliament. These include: 
 Chief Ministers of Karnataka: S. R. Bommai and J. H. Patel
 Union Ministers: B. Shankaranand, Sarojini Mahishi and R. D. Khalap
 Ministers in various departments of Karnataka State Government: G. B. Shankar Rao, Haranahalli Ramaswamy, B. Basavalingappa, D. K. Naikar, L.  G. Havanur, N. M. K. Sogi and A. B. Jakanur
 Former Speaker of the Karnataka Legislative Assembly: B. G. Banakar
 Former Education Minister of Goa: Luizinho Faleiro
 Former Chief Secretary to the Government of Karnataka: A. B. Datar
 Other Members of Parliament: Ramachandra Reddy, S. B. Sidnal, A. K. Kotrashetty, Patil Puttappa, Shri, Suresh Angadi and D. B. Chandre Gowda

Other Notable Alumni
 K. K. Venugopal 	- Senior Adovacate, Supreme Court, and Former Addl. Solicitor General, Attorney General of India (2017- )
 Shri A.B. Datar 	- Former Chief Secretary, Govt. of Karnataka.
 Shri S.S. Wadeyar 	- Ex. Vice-Chancellor, Karnatak University, Dharwad
 Shri V.B. Coutinho 	- Vice Chancellor, Gulbarga University
 Shri Charuhasan 	- The Noted Cine Personality- National Award Winner for "Tabarana Kathe" Kannada Film.
 Shri Arjun Devaiah 	- Outstanding Sportsman, selected for Asian Games for running Events
 Shri S.V. Kallur 	- Senate Member – 1994
 Miss Afshan Shabaskhan, State Women's Cricket Team Member -1996
 Miss M.A. Katti 	- Senate Member- 1997
 Miss Vedavati S. Kuppasi  - Senate Member – 1996
 Shri Raju B. Harti - Awarded the prestigious presidents awards, "JEEVAN RAKSHA PADAK" for saving the life of a girl from electrocution
 Adv. Fr. Johny Mathew 	- Member, Juvenile Justice Board, Govt of Karnataka, Bangalore
 Shri Shrihari Kugaji 	- Selected as Commissioned Officer in Army (2007)

Judicial Officers
 Shri Vishwanath V Mugati  - Judicial Officer – Civil Judge – Selected in 2003
 Shri K. Guruprasad 	- Judicial Officer – Civil Judge – Selected in 2008
 Shri Rajesh M. Kamate 	- Judicial Officer – Civil Judge – Selected in 2008
 Shri Ganagadhar C. Hadapad 	- Judicial Officer – Civil Judge – Selected in 2008
 Shri Shivanand M. Jipare 	- Judicial Officer – Civil Judge – Selected in 2008
 Shri Venkatesh B. Hosmani 	- Judicial Officer – Civil Judge – Selected in 2008
 Shri M. R. Wadeyar 	- Judicial Officer – Civil Judge – Selected in 2008
 Shri I. M. Mujawar 	- Judicial Officer – Civil Judge – Selected in 2008
 Smt. Radharani M. Kolambe 	- Judicial Officer – Civil Judge – Selected in 2008
 Shri Rajesh S. Chinnannavar 	- Judicial Officer – Civil Judge – Selected in 2008
 Shri Guruprasad R. Kulkarni 	- Judicial Officer – Civil Judge – Selected in 2008
 Shri Hanamantarao Kulkarni 	- Judicial Officer – Civil Judge – Selected in 2013
 Smt. Ashwini Mahabaleshwar Hattiholi 	- Judicial Officer – Civil Judge – Selected in 2013
 Shri Hanumanth Anantharao Satwik 	- Judicial Officer – Civil Judge – Selected in 2013
 Shri Deepak Patil 	- Judicial Officer – Civil Judge – Selected in 2013
 Shri Allappa Mahadevappa Badiger 	- Judicial Officer – Civil Judge – Selected in 2013
 Shri Shivanand Laxman Anchi 	- Judicial Officer – Civil Judge – Selected in 2013
 Shri Kurani Kant Dhaku 	- Judicial Officer – Civil Judge – Selected in 2013
 Shri Padmakar Vanakudre 	- Judicial Officer – Civil Judge – Selected in 2013
 Smt. Deepa Gopal Manerkar 	- Judicial Officer – Civil Judge – Selected in 2013
 Shri Mahesh Patil - Judicial Officer – Civil Judge – Selected in 2013

Assistant Public Prosecutors
 Shri D D Harugeri 	- 2000 Batch – Selected in 2014 
 Shri Bharat B Shirhatti 	- 2004 Batch – Selected in 2014 
 Shri Ajith Janagowda 	- 2004 Batch – Selected in 2014 
 Shri Vinayak Mayannavar 	- 2006 Batch – Selected in 2014 
 Shri Lagama Hukkeri 	- 2006 Batch – Selected in 2014 
 Shri. N.N.Mirza 	- 2006 Batch – Selected in 2014 
 Shri M M Kanatti 	- Selected in 2014 
 Shri Gandhi Biraj - Selected in 2014

In cinema, sports and other fields

National award-winning actor Charu Hassan, national athlete Arjun Devaiah.
Vice-Chancellors of university: S. S. Wadeyar, Vice-Chancellor of Karnatak University, Dharwad; and V. B. Coutinho, former Vice-Chancellor of Gulbarga University.

Advocate Fr. Johny Mathew, Member of Juvenile Justice Board, Bangalore; Shrihari Kugaji, environmentalist and an army officer; Shrihari Patil, Lieutenant & Advocate Judge, Indian Navy;  and Raju B. Harti, winner of "Jeevan Raksha Padak" for saving the life of a girl from electrocution.

T. M. Rudraiah, Former managing director, Shimoga D.C.C Bank.

References

External links
Raja Lakhamgouda Law College

Law schools in Karnataka
Educational institutions established in 1939
1939 establishments in India
Universities and colleges in Belgaum